The 2005 Toledo Rockets football team represented the University of Toledo during the 2005 NCAA Division I-A football season. They competed as a member of the Mid-American Conference (MAC) in the West Division. The Rockets were led by head coach Tom Amstutz and senior quarterback Bruce Gradkowski.

Schedule

Personnel

Season summary

at Bowling Green

References

Toledo
Toledo Rockets football seasons
LendingTree Bowl champion seasons
Toledo Rockets football